Alankara Asanka Silva (born 4 April 1985) is a Sri Lankan first-class cricketer who plays for Saracens Sports Club. He holds the record for the highest individual score when batting at number 11 in a Twenty20 match (26 not out). He is a past pupil of Thissa Central College, Kalutara.

References

External links
 

1985 births
Living people
Sri Lankan cricketers
Saracens Sports Club cricketers
People from Kalutara
Ampara District cricketers
Hambantota Troopers cricketers
Asian Games medalists in cricket
Cricketers at the 2014 Asian Games
Asian Games gold medalists for Sri Lanka
Medalists at the 2014 Asian Games